Jack Bergin (born 1954) is an Irish retired hurler who played as a right corner-back for the Tipperary senior team.

Born in Littleton, County Tipperary, Bergin first arrived on the inter-county scene at the age of twenty when he first linked up with the Tipperary under-21 team. He joined the senior panel during the 1974 championship. Bergin went on to play a bit part for over a decade, however, he ended his career without any silverware.

At club level Bergin is a one-time Munster medallist with Moycarkey–Borris. In addition to this he also won two championship medals.

His brother, Liam also played with Tipperary, while his nephew, Kieran, is a current member of the Tipperary team.

Throughout his career Bergin made 5 championship appearances. He retired from inter-county hurling following the conclusion of the 1986 championship.

In retirement from playing Bergin has become involved in team management and coaching. As a selector with the Tipperary senior team between 1998 and 2005 he helped the team to All-Ireland, Munster and National League honours..

Honours

Player

Moycarkey–Borris
Munster Senior Club Hurling Championship (1): 1982
Tipperary Senior Hurling Championship (2): 1982, 1984

Selector

Tipperary
All-Ireland Senior Hurling Championship (1): 2001
Munster Senior Hurling Championship (1): 2001
National Hurling League (2): 1999, 2001

References

1954 births
Living people
Moycarkey-Borris hurlers
Tipperary inter-county hurlers
Hurling selectors